Justin Stanley is an Australian musician, producer and songwriter.

He has worked with an eclectic range of musicians including Beck, Prince, Jimmy Cliff, Leonard Cohen, Paul McCartney and Snoop Dogg.
Some of the artists Stanley had produced,  include Eric Clapton, Sheryl Crow, Jet, Jamie Lidell, Nikka Costa, Jimmy Fallon, Mark Ronson, Mocky and Ryan Bingham. He lives in California, with his wife, Nikka Costa.

Work with Beck
Stanley joined Beck's band in 2005 for the Guero tour, playing guitars and percussion.

He then went on to play on Beck's album, The Information, and worked with Beck on the soundtrack and score for the film Nacho Libre, starring Jack Black.

Selected discography

Filmography

References

External links
 MySpace Page
 rolandus.com Insider

Australian musicians
Living people
Year of birth missing (living people)